Joe J Stankevicius (born September 1, 1978 in Dundas, Ontario) is a Canadian rower. He won the gold medal at both the 2003 and 2002 world championships for Canada's men's eight team in Milan, Italy and Seville, Spain respectively. In 2004 he competed at the Athens Olympics.

References

1978 births
Living people
Olympic rowers of Canada
Rowers at the 2004 Summer Olympics
Sportspeople from Ontario
Canadian male rowers